The House at 15 Gilmore Street in Quincy, Massachusetts, is a well-preserved Craftsman bungalow.  The -story wood-frame house was built in 1908 by Albert Nelson, the builder who developed Gilmore Street in response to the arrival of the railroad in the area in the 1880s.  The front-gable house has extended eaves with exposed rafters along the sides, and the front gable projects over the porch, which is supported by thick square pillars on granite posts.

The house was listed on the National Register of Historic Places in 1989.

See also
National Register of Historic Places listings in Quincy, Massachusetts

References

Houses completed in 1908
Houses in Quincy, Massachusetts
National Register of Historic Places in Quincy, Massachusetts
Houses on the National Register of Historic Places in Norfolk County, Massachusetts
1908 establishments in Massachusetts